Eledoisin is an undecapeptide of mollusk origin, belonging to the tachykinin family of neuropeptides.

It was first isolated from the posterior salivary glands of two mollusk species Eledone muschata and Eledone aldovandi, which belong to the octopod order of Cephalopoda.

Other tachykinins from nonmammalian sources include kassinin and physalaemin. The mammalian tachykinins substance P, NKA, and NKB have similar effects as tachykinins of nonmammals and have been more widely studied and characterized.  These peptides exhibit a wide and complex spectrum of pharmacological and physiological activities such as vasodilation, hypertension, and stimulation of extravascular smooth muscle.

Eledoisin has the amino acid sequence pGlu-Pro-Ser-Lys-Asp-Ala-Phe-Ile-Gly-Leu-Met-NH2 (qPSKDAFIGLM-NH2) where pGlu and q stand for pyroglutamic acid.   Like all tachykinin peptides, Eledoisin shares the same consensus C-terminal sequence, that is, Phe-Xxx-Gly-Leu-Met-NH.  The invariant "Phe7" residue is probably required for receptor binding. "Xxx" is either an aromatic (phenylalanine, tyrosine) or a branched aliphatic (valine, isoleucine) side chain and is thought to be important in receptor selectivity. This common region, often referred to as the "message domain," is believed to be responsible for activating the receptor. The divergent N-terminal region or the "address domain" varies in amino-acid sequence and length and is believed to play a role in determining the receptor subtype specificity.

References 

Marine neurotoxins
Neuropeptides
Neurotransmitters
Octopus toxins